The 2022 Wyoming Cowboys football team represented the University of Wyoming as a member of the Mountain Division of the Mountain West Conference during the 2022 NCAA Division I FBS football season. The Cowboys were led by ninth-year head coach Craig Bohl and played their home games at War Memorial Stadium.

Schedule

Roster

Statistics

Team

Individual Leaders

Passing

Rushing

Receiving

Defense

Key: POS: Position, SOLO: Solo Tackles, AST: Assisted Tackles, TOT: Total Tackles, TFL: Tackles-for-loss, SACK: Quarterback Sacks, INT: Interceptions, BU: Passes Broken Up, PD: Passes Defended, QBH: Quarterback Hits, FR: Fumbles Recovered, FF: Forced Fumbles, BLK: Kicks or Punts Blocked, SAF: Safeties, TD : Touchdown

Special teams

References

Wyoming
Wyoming Cowboys football seasons
Wyoming Cowboys football